BLME (Bank of London and The Middle East Plc) is an independent UK Sharia’a  compliant bank and is the largest Islamic bank in Europe. It was founded in 2006 and offers financial services in three core areas: wealth management, commercial real estate finance and savings products. Bank of London and The Middle East Plc is authorised by the Prudential Regulation Authority and regulated by the Financial Conduct Authority and the Prudential Regulation Authority.

History 

BLME was first incorporated in London on 7 August 2006, originally under the name House of London and The Middle East, changing to Bank of London and The Middle East in July 2007. Humphrey Percy, Founder and CEO, met with the original sponsors, Boubyan Bank, establishing their common ambitions to build a market leading wholesale Islamic bank.

BLME received authorisation from the Financial Services Authority (FSA) in July 2007 with a full set of permissions and European passporting.

Since its launch the bank has grown significantly. In 2008 BLME completed their second private placement bringing their total capital base to £250million. BLME launched their Wealth Management division including a Private Bank and Asset Management offering in early 2009. 

Nomo 

In July 2021, BLME launched Nomo, a fully licensed, Sharia-compliant UK digital bank. 

Since its establishment, BLME has won numerous awards for its services, including several from Islamic Finance News Awards: Best Islamic Bank in Europe (2008), Best Islamic Bank in UK (2009 & 2010, 2011, 2012 and 2013) Best Islamic Leasing Provider (2009) and Deal of the Year (2009).  BLME was also awarded the WIBC  Institutional Excellence Award in 2009. In 2011, 2012 and 2013 BLME was awarded Best Islamic Bank in Europe by Global Finance Magazine. In 2013 BLME won Reuters/Zawya Best International Asset Manager of the year award.

BLME and Sharia’a Compliance 

As an Islamic bank, BLME ensures that its services are wholly Sharia’a compliant and uses this principle to underpin all of its practices. From the very beginning, the bank has had a dedicated a Sharia’a Supervisory Board (SSB) to review contracts and agreements. This ensures that all policies, practices and governance are in compliance with Sharia’a and Islamic jurisprudence, rooted in transparency, fairness and clarity. This Sharia’a specific regulation and governance is in addition to the conventional regulation that applies to all UK based financial institutions.

See also 

List of banks in the United Kingdom
Islamic Banking

References 
Notes

External links 
 Bank of London and the Middle East official website
 Beginners Guide to Islamic Finance

Banks established in 2006
Banks based in the City of London
Islamic economic jurisprudence